Millan House is a historic co-op in Lenox Hill on the Upper East Side of Manhattan in New York City, USA. They co-op is made up of two buildings located at 115 East 67th Street and 116 East 68th Street, with 57 apartments in total. They are connected by "a formal back garden".

History
The land was given to the Baptist Church shortly after the American Civil War. By 1929, John D. Rockefeller, Jr. purchased the land from the church for US$1 million. He hired architect Andrew J. Thomas to design the building. Construction began in 1930. It was completed in 1931.

Early tenants included Simon Flexner, Herbert L. Pratt, Jr. (the son of Herbert L. Pratt) and Witherbee Black (of the family silversmith firm Black, Starr & Frost-Gorham). By 1947, tenant J. W. Boardman Milligan insisted upon turning the rent-only building into a co-op. Later, Frank K. Houston, the chairman and chief executive officer of the Chemical Bank, lived here until his death in 1973.

Architectural significance
The buildings are contributing properties to the Upper East Side Historic District.

References

Upper East Side
Residential buildings completed in 1931
Condominiums and housing cooperatives in Manhattan
1931 establishments in New York City